The year 658 BC was a year of the pre-Julian Roman calendar. In the Roman Empire, it was known as year 96 Ab urbe condita . The denomination 658 BC for this year has been used since the early medieval period, when the Anno Domini calendar era became the prevalent method in Europe for naming years.

Events
 End of the rule of Duke Zhuang in Yan.
 End of the rule of Miltiades in Athens.
 End of the rule of Énna Derg in Ireland (according to Foras Feasa ar Éirinn by Geoffrey Keating).

Births

Deaths

References